Under the Table Tennis is Tim Fite's ninth album.  Like a number of his previous albums, it was released free of charge on his website.

Track listing 
"For-Closure" (2:57)
"Oversight" (1:09)
"Someone Threw the Baby Out" (4:20)
"Not Covred" (3:08)
"Jobs" (2:57)
"ExExEx" (1:57)
"No Notice" (2:26)
"Never Lay Down" (3:46)
"Money Back" (3:36)
"Napkin" (1:38)
"Go Sell It On the Mountain" (3:19)
"WYNPM" (3:17)
"Support Tim Fite" (1:28)
"We Didn't Warn You" (3:29)

2010 albums
Tim Fite albums
Albums free for download by copyright owner